Underbelly Files: Infiltration is an Australian made-for-television movie that aired on 14 February 2011 on the Nine Network. It is the second of four television movies in the Underbelly Files series, the other three being Tell Them Lucifer was Here, The Man Who Got Away, and Chopper.

It tells the true story of Victorian detective Colin McLaren who posed as a shady art dealer and infiltrated the Australian branch of the Calabrian Mafia. The character Antonio Russo is loosely based on Antonio Romeo of the Honoured Society (Australia).

The ISAN production code number is 0000-0002-9A74-0002-L-0000-0000-B or 170612-2 (in shorter decimal form).

Synopsis
Infiltration tells the true story of Victorian detective Colin McLaren, who posed as a shady art dealer for 18 months and infiltrated the Australian branch of the Calabrian Mafia. It resulted in the biggest win of his career, seeing 11 of Australia's most villainous Mafiosi sent to prison. Valentino del Toro and Emma de Clario play their mafia family roles with truth and power

Cast

 Roy Billing as Aussie Bob
Buddy Dannoun as Rosario Torcaso
Valentino del Toro as Antonio Russo
 Emma de Clario as Maria Russo
Matthew Green as The Murder Victim
Al Vila as Carlo Ricci
 Glenda Linscott as Sandra
 Sullivan Stapleton as Colin McLaren
 Henry Nixon as Leigh
Alfredo Malabello as Vito
 Jessica Napier as Jude Gleeson / Narrator
Donna Matthews as Bubbles
Richard Piper as Roger
Fantine Banulski as Louise Russo
Luke Christopoulos as Little Tony Russo
Ange Arabatzis as Nico
Brian Gore as Melbourne Associate
Serge Vercion as Calabrian Farmer
Mirko Grillini as Rocci Russo
Stephen Lopez as Dominic Torcaso
 Tottie Goldsmith as Sara Herlihy
Josh Price as Tiny
Arthur Angel as Vinnie Messina
Kassandra Clementi as Chelsea McLaren
Meisha Lowe as Kim
Natalie Pantou as Elise Messina
 Melissa Howard as Chelsea's Friend
Susan Davidson as Monica
Rheanna Duff as Prostitute
Madeleine Harding as Rachel
Rai Fazio as Massimo Falzetta
Steve Hayden as Geoffrey Bowen
Alex Borg as Peter Wallis
Kevin Stewart as Police Commissioner
Doug Bowles as Ziggy
Adam Williams as S.E.R.T.
Mark Goodrem as Clerk
John Higginson as Defense Barrister
 Darran Scott as Magistrate

Ratings
Infiltration aired on 14 February 2011 at 8:30pm and pulled in an audience of 1.113 million viewers which ranked it the #6 rating show for that night. However it was down from the previous Underbelly telemovie which pulled in 1.377 million viewers.

References

Nine Network original programming
Films about organised crime in Australia
Films about the 'Ndrangheta
2011 films